Varuzhan Yepremyan (born 1959 in Artashat, Armenia) is an Armenian painter.

Biography 

In 1978 after graduating from the Yerevan Art College by Terlemezyan he continued his once started way in the studio of Yerevan Fine Arts and Theatre Institute (professor - Ara Bekaryan). Varuzhan Yepremyan is a member of the Union of Artists of Armenia, a member of the Creative union of artists of Russia, a member of creative association of artists MIR.

Exhibitions 
Personal
 1981 Yerevan conservatory
 1992 The Arabian Peninsula (Sharjah)
 1994 Westeros (Sweden)
 1999 the "Blue living-room" gallery (Saint-Petersburg)
 2000 Perm, gallery of petroleum company
 2001 the "Blue living-room" gallery (Saint-Petersburg)
 2002 INKAS-bank (Saint-Petersburg)
 2002 Bank Saint-Petersburg
 2003 Mansion of Neytgard (Saint-Petersburg)
 2004 the "Blue living-room" gallery (Saint-Petersburg)
 2005 Yusupov palace (Saint-Petersburg)
 2005 "Mansard of artists" gallery (Saint-Petersburg)
 2006 the "Blue living-room" gallery Saint-Petersburg)
 2006 House of scientists (Saint-Petersburg)
 2007 Maria palace (Saint-Petersburg)
 2007 "Gallery at the Bastion "(Pskov)
 2008 Gallery "E" (St. Petersburg)
 2008 The Council of Federation (Moscow)
 2009 Gallery of Art-Hotel "Trezzini"
 2009 Museum of Art and Industry Academy AM Stieglitz
 2010 ART-HALL AS Monaco FC
 2011 The city museum of sculpture of St. Petersburg

Group
 1999 Bienaile (Saint-Petersburg)
 2000 Berlin, Russian house
 2000 Moscow, CDX
 2001 Munich
 2001 Moscow, CDX (a 1700-year of adopting Christianity in Armenia)
 2002 in embassy of Armenia in Russia (Moscow)
 2003 St-petersburg's painters in "Palette" gallery (Saint-Petersburg)
 2003 the modern artists of Saint-Petersburg in the department of UNO (Sweden)
 2004 ART-Ext (New-York)
 2005 counsel of exhibition the "Armenian painters in Petersburg" (building of the Saint-Petersburg conservatory)
 2010 Cadet Corps Manege (France - Russia) (Saint-Petersburg)
 2010 Museum of City Sculpture "Rojdestvo" (Saint-Petersburg)

External links 
 Varuzhan Yepremyan Official Website - Gallery, oil paintings, personal and group exhibitions... 

1959 births
Living people
People from Ararat Province
Armenian painters
20th-century Russian painters
Russian male painters
21st-century Russian painters
20th-century Russian male artists
21st-century Russian male artists